Patricia Nelson Limerick (born May 17, 1951) is an American historian, author, lecturer and teacher, considered to be one of the leading historians of the American West.

Early life and education
Limerick is the daughter of Grant and Patricia Nelson and was born and raised in Banning, California. She received a B.A. in American studies in 1972 at the University of California, Santa Cruz, and a Ph.D. in American studies in 1980 at Yale University.

Career

Limerick taught at Yale University as a graduate teaching assistant, where she helped teach the highly regarded "daily themes" class.  She was then an assistant professor of history at Harvard University from 1980 to 1984, when she joined the University of Colorado at Boulder. Limerick became a tenured Associate Professor of History in 1987 and a Full Professor in 1991. She was also chair of the Board of the Center of the American West.

She was president of the Organization of American Historians (2014) and is a former president of the American Studies Association (1996–1997) and the Western History Association (2000).

Limerick is known for her 1987 book The Legacy of Conquest, which is part of a body of historical writing sometimes known as the New Western History. Her essay on the Modoc War, titled "Haunted America" appears in the collection Ways of Reading, a textbook widely used by undergraduate English students. She also co-edited a collection of essays, titled Trails: Toward a New Western History which relate to her 1989 "Trails Through Time" exhibit.

In 1995, Limerick was awarded a MacArthur Fellowship.

In January 2016, she was appointed to be the Colorado State Historian and served until August 2018.  Also in January 2016, she was appointed to the National Council on the Humanities, the advisory board to the National Endowment for the Humanities. Limerick was nominated by President Obama in spring 2015 and was confirmed by the United States Senate in November 2015.

In late September 2022, Glen Krutz, the new dean of the College of Arts and Sciences at CU Boulder, fired Limerick from her position as head of the Center of the American West. The executive committee of the Center of the American West board resigned in protest.

Works

Academic

Op-eds
Monthly column for the Denver Post (current)

Awards and honors

Alumni Achievement Award, University of California, Santa Cruz, 1990
State Humanist of the Year, Colorado Endowment for the Humanities, 1992
MacArthur Fellow, 1995–2000
Hazel Barnes Prize, University of Colorado's highest award for teaching and research, 2001
Colorado State Geographic Naming Advisory Board, Aug. 2020

Personal life
Limerick's first marriage was to architect Jeffrey Limerick, who died of a stroke in 2005. She married J. Houston Kempton in 2007.

References
Notes

Further reading
Lauck, Jon K. (Fall 2011) "How South Dakota Sparked the New Western History Wars: A Commentary on Patricia Nelson Limerick," South Dakota History 41. 353–81.

External links
Limerick's monthly column in the Denver Post
C-SPAN video, "Fifty Years: Reflections of the Past & Future of Western History," a session at the Western History Association's annual meeting, Oct. 13, 2011

American columnists
21st-century American historians
Historians of the United States
Historians of the American West
MacArthur Fellows
People from Banning, California
University of California, Santa Cruz alumni
Yale University alumni
Harvard University faculty
University of Colorado Boulder faculty
1951 births
Living people
American women historians
Journalists from California
American women columnists
21st-century American women
Historians from California